Ian Fleming: Bondmaker is a 2005 BBC Television drama telling the life story of the British author Ian Fleming.

Cast
George Asprey as Officer

External links
 

BBC television dramas
Works about Ian Fleming
Spy drama television films
Films directed by John Alexander